Robert "Rob" Watson, is a market transformation expert, international leader in the green building movement and CEO and chief scientist of The ECON Group. He founded the LEED Green Building Rating System of the United States Green Building Council (USGBC) in 1993 and was its founding chairman until 2006.

After helping to pioneer the green building concept as the "Father of LEED", Watson founded the EcoTech International Group (ETI) to meet the fast-growing demand for green building technologies and services in China, Russia, India and the United States. 

Since 2008, Watson has also been the executive editor of GreenerBuildings.com where he blogs about the state of green building.  His work on green buildings in China and green technology in general has been featured in numerous publications, including Fortune Magazine and The Economist  and has been referenced on multiple occasions by New York Times columnist, Thomas Friedman.  In Thomas Friedman's 2008 book, Hot, Flat, and Crowded, Watson is described as "one of the best environmental minds in America."

Watson was the only foreigner to have been honored by Ministry of Housing and Urban-Rural Development of the People's Republic of China with its first Green Innovation Award in Beijing in 2005. In 2002, he was named as the first recipient of the U.S. Green Building Council's Leadership Award For Lifetime Achievement for his work with the organization.

Life and work
As a senior scientist and director of the International Energy and Green Building programs at the Natural Resources Defense Council (NRDC) from 1985 to 2006, Watson was active in international sustainable building, utility and transportation issues in a dozen countries including China, the United States and Russia.

Since 1997, Watson has worked with the Ministry of Construction of China to develop green building standards and energy codes for commercial and residential buildings.  He also was the principal coordinator for ACCORD21, a key green building demonstration project in Beijing for the Ministry of Science and Technology of the People's Republic of China (MOST) and the U.S. Department of Energy (DOE). This building was the first to receive LEED Certification in China at the Gold Level.

Watson created the first documented, quantifiable “Green Office” in the U.S. for the Natural Resources Defense Council's NYC headquarters in 1987.  Watson took primary responsibility for developing the green features of NRDC's showcase green offices in Washington, D.C., and the LEED Platinum Level Robert Redford Building  in Los Angeles — one of the highest recipients of LEED points in the world. He also consulted on the San Francisco office, which achieved LEED Gold Level Certification.

Watson was a member of the executive committee for the President's Council on Sustainable Development 1999 National Town Meeting and was the Operations Group Leader for the 1993 Greening of the White House  initiative spearheaded by President Bill Clinton.

Education
Watson received a Master of Business Administration (MBA) from Columbia University, holds a Master of Science (MS) degree from the University of California, Berkeley Energy Resources Group (ERG) and is a graduate of Dartmouth College where he was a senior fellow. In 1993, Watson was the first Environmental Fellow at the Institute of Transportation Studies at University of California, Davis.

See also
U.S. Green Building Council
Leadership in Energy and Environmental Design

References

External links
 The ECON Group
 Natural Resources Defense Council
 NRDC Building Green
 ACCORD21 Project
 China Clean Energy
 U.S. Green Building Council
 LEED Green Building Rating System
 GreenBiz.com

1961 births
Living people
Businesspeople from Chicago
Columbia Business School alumni
American chief executives
Dartmouth College alumni